Lucy Qinnuayuak (1915–1982) was an Inuit graphic artist and printmaker.

Biography
Qinnuayuak was born in or near Salluit, Quebec in 1915. At an early age her family moved to Baffin Island, where they settled in Cape Dorset. She was married to Tikituk Quinnuayuak as a teenager, which was arranged. Her husband Tikituk was a sculptor and graphic artist.
They continued living a traditional hunting lifestyle, moving around the Foxe Peninsula and within various camps such as the Shapujuak, Ittiliakjuk, Igalallik, and Kangia.

Artistic career
Qinnuayuak began drawing in the late 1950s and was one of the first to respond to James Archibald Houston request for Inuit printmaking. Her work was first included in the Cape Dorset print collection in 1961, and by the time of her death in 1982, 136 of her prints were published in the collection. Qinnuayuak worked primarily in graphite and colored pencils, but did more experimenting in the 1970s–80s with watercolor and acrylic paints. In the final two decades of her life, she created thousands of images of the stylized birds and scenes depicting women's roles in the traditional Inuit culture.  
Known for her renderings of arctic birds, Qinnuayuak's work has exhibited extensively in and outside of Canada. One of her designs was used in promotional banners for the 1976 Summer Olympics and her stone cut We all have something to do is part of the Senate of Canada's Aboriginal art collection.

Qinnuayuak's work has been exhibited in more than eighty group and solo shows including The Inuit Print exhibition, organized by the Department of Indian Affairs and Canadian Museum of Civilization, that toured internationally from 1977 to 1982. Her pieces are held by several institutions worldwide including the Art Gallery of Ontario, the Canadian Museum of History, the Inuit Cultural Institute, the Art Gallery of Sudbury, the Macdonald Stewart Art Centre, the University of Michigan Museum of Art, the Louisiana Art & Science Museum, the Albuquerque Museum, Saint Mary's College Museum of Art, the Museum of Anthropology at the University of British Columbia, the San Juan Islands Museum of Art, the Agnes Etherington Art Centre, the National Gallery of Canada, and the National Museum of the American Indian.

Personal life
Lucy and Tikitu had nine children, five of whom died in childhood. They also adopted two children, and took care of the five orphaned children of Tikitu's brother, Niviaqsi. Her husband and niece, Kenojuak Ashevak, were also involved in the arts. She died on 10 September 1982.

Major exhibits
Birds and Flowers: Eskimo Graphics by Lucy Qinnuayuak, Arctic Artistry, New York, 1989
Looking South: Winnipeg Art Gallery, 1978

References

Further reading

1915 births
1982 deaths
Inuit printmakers
Artists from Quebec
Artists from Nunavut
People from Nunavik
People from Kinngait
Women printmakers
Canadian Inuit women
Inuit from Quebec
20th-century Canadian women artists
Bird artists
20th-century Canadian printmakers